The 1996 Wyoming Cowboys football team represented the University of Wyoming in the 1996 NCAA Division I-A football season. It was the Cowboys' 100th season and they competed as a member of the Pacific Division in the Western Athletic Conference (WAC). The team was led by head coach Joe Tiller, in his sixth year, and played their home games at War Memorial Stadium in Laramie, Wyoming. They finished with a record of ten wins and two losses (10–2, 7–1 WAC). Despite winning the Pacific Division and their double-digit victory total, the Cowboys were not invited to a postseason bowl game. Their season ended with a loss against BYU in the inaugural WAC Championship Game. The Cowboys offense scored 464 points while the defense allowed 284 points.

Schedule

Reference:

Roster

Awards and honors
Marcus Harris, Fred Biletnikoff Award

Team players in the NFL
The following were selected in the 1997 NFL Draft.

Reference:

References

Wyoming
Wyoming Cowboys football seasons
Wyoming Cowboys football